Tiszakarád is a village in Borsod-Abaúj-Zemplén county, Hungary.

External links 

Populated places in Borsod-Abaúj-Zemplén County